Blitz Vega is a Rock band based between New York City and Los Angeles featuring Andy Rourke bassist of The Smiths alongside frontman and guitarist Kav Sandhu of the Happy Mondays. The band debuted their first single "Hey Christo" on April 16, 2019. It was described as 'a rager that springs from the Primal Scream/Kasabian/Black Rebel Motorcycle Club family tree' by Buzz Bands LA.

In April 2019 they recorded a live EP at Abbey Road Studios and featured on Red Stripe Presents: This Feeling TV presented by Laura Whitmore and Gordon Smart.

The band played their debut live show on July 24, 2019, at The House Of Machines in L.A.'s Arts District. They followed up with the release of their second single "Lost & Found" on September 20, 2019, and a single for Halloween on October 30, 2019, "LA Vampire".

The band have recently released a new single "Strong Forever" on November 17, 2022. This song not only featured the band members, but their guest guitarist was Johnny Marr, the guitarist of The Smiths, with the first reunion of any ex-members of The Smiths. The release of this new single brought with it a Rolling Stones Magazine publication of a new article on the band.

Band Members 

 Andy Rourke, Bassist
 Kav Sandhu, Guitarist and Main Vocalist
 Craig Eriksson, Drummer
 Greg Gent, Pianist

Tour Dates 
Future tour dates are yet to be announced by the band.

Social Media 
The band can be found on most social media platforms:

 Instagram: @blitzvega
 Facebook: BlitzVegamusic
 Twitter: @BlitzVegamusic

References

Musical groups from New York City
Musical groups from Los Angeles
Musical groups established in 2019
American rock music groups
2019 establishments in the United States